The 2004 Alberta general election was held on November 22, 2004 to elect members of the Legislative Assembly of Alberta.

The election was called on October 25, 2004. Premier Ralph Klein decided to go to the polls earlier than the legislated deadline of March 2006. This election was held in conjunction with the 2004 Alberta Senate nominee election.

When the election was called, it was expected to be anticlimactic, with Klein cruising to his fourth straight majority, the tenth for his Progressive Conservative Party.

Shortly after the drop of the writs, Klein's mother died and all parties suspended their campaigns for several days. After the campaign resumed, Klein avoided making any policy announcements and attended few events. One commentator called it "Kleinfeld: the campaign about nothing" (a reference to the television sitcom Seinfeld). The Liberal Party, which had hoped to hold on to the five seats it had and regain the two seats that it had lost to resignations, began to pick up momentum and became far more optimistic.

In the end, the Conservatives were re-elected, despite losing 11 seats and 15% of the popular vote, having dropped to a minority position in the polls. The Liberals more than doubled their seats by electing 17 MLAs on election night while dominating Edmonton, and making strong inroads in Calgary. The Alberta New Democrats (NDP) held on to their two seats and gained two more, all in Edmonton.

The Conservatives swept rural Alberta except for one seat that went to the Alberta Alliance, which also placed second in a number of rural ridings. The Conservatives received no more than 56 percent of the vote in any of the three rural regions so was very much over-represented by its one-party sweep of the rural seats.

The Alberta Greens gained in the popular vote, jumping from 0.3% in the 2001 election to 2.8%, and placed third in some places. Although placing second in the riding of Drayton Valley-Calmar ahead of the Liberals, it did not win any seats, however. 

Social Credit placed third in a number of ridings, and its leader tied for second in Rocky Mountain House. 

The Conservative, Liberal and NDP leaders all easily held onto their own seats.

Electoral System 
Alberta's 83 MLAs were elected through First-past-the-post voting in 83 single-member districts.

Election night summary 

Overall voter turnout was 45.12%.

Note:
* The Alberta Alliance and Alberta Party did not contest the 2001 election.
1 The Separation Party results are compared to the Alberta First Party.
2 A judicial recount changed the results in Edmonton Castle Downs, Liberal. Chris Kibermanis lost to Progressive Conservative Thomas Lukaszuk.

Results by region 

1 "Edmonton" corresponds to only the city of Edmonton. (Only the ridings whose names begin with "Edmonton".) The four suburban ridings around the city as listed below are grouped with Central Alberta in this table.

Results by riding

Results by riding 

Names in bold indicate party leaders and cabinet ministers.

Northern Alberta

Western and Central Alberta

East Central Alberta

Central Edmonton 

|-
|bgcolor=whitesmoke|Edmonton Beverly Clareview
|
|Julius Yankowsky3,059
|
|Sam Parmar1,166
||
|Ray Martin5,268
|
|Phil Gamache457
|
|Benoit Couture141
|
|Ken Shipka (Soc. Cred.)283
||
|Julius Yankowsky
|-
|bgcolor=whitesmoke|Edmonton Centre
|
|Don Weideman2,622
||
|Laurie Blakeman6,236
|
|Mary Elizabeth Archer1,538
|
|Tony Caterina264
|
|David J. Parker336
|
|Linda Clements (Soc. Cred.)111
||
|Laurie Blakeman
|-
|bgcolor=whitesmoke|Edmonton-Glenora
|
|Drew Hutton3,758
||
|Bruce Miller4,610
|
|Larry Booi4,059
|
|Blaine Currie307
|
|Peter Johnston272
|
|Walter Schachenhofer (Soc. Cred.)112
||
|Drew Hutton
|-
|bgcolor=whitesmoke|Edmonton Gold Bar
|
|Manjit Dhaliwal2,574
||
|Hugh MacDonald8,794
|
|Keith Turnbull1,966
|
|Delmar Hunt538
|
| 
|
|Dave Dowling (Ind.)167
||
|Hugh MacDonald
|-
|bgcolor=whitesmoke|Edmonton Highlands-Norwood
|
|Terry Martiniuk2,209
|
|Jason Manzevich1,035
||
|Brian Mason6,053
|
|Ray Loyer315
|
| 
|
|Dale W. Ferris (Ind.)66
||
|Brian Mason
|-
|bgcolor=whitesmoke|Edmonton Mill Creek
||
|Gene Zwozdesky5,071
|
|Aman Gill4,286
|
|Nathan Taylor1,709
|
|Robert Alford523
|
|Eric Steiglitz386
|
|Cameron Johnson (Ind.)72
||
|Gene Zwozdesky
|-
|bgcolor=whitesmoke|Edmonton-Mill Woods
|
|Naresh Bhardwaj2,989
||
|Weslyn Mather5,014
|
|Lloyd Nelson1,565
|
|Charles Relland816
|
| 
|
|Naomi Rankin (Communist)42
||
|Don Massey
|-
|bgcolor=whitesmoke|Edmonton Riverview
|
|Fred Horne3,571
||
|Kevin Taft10,279
|
|Donna Martyn1,053
|
|David Edgar315
|
|John Lackey355
|
|Dave W. Power (Soc. Cred.)111
||
|Kevin Taft
|-
|bgcolor=whitesmoke|Edmonton Rutherford
|
|Ian McClelland4,173
||
|Rick Miller7,217
|
|George A. Slade995
|
|R. J. (Bob) Ewart516
|
| 
|
|Anit Ashmore (Soc. Cred.)210
||
|Ian McClelland
|-
|bgcolor=whitesmoke|Edmonton-Strathcona
|
|Shannon Stubbs2,256
|
|Steven Leard1,850
||
|Raj Pannu7,430
|
|Jeremy Burns275
|
|Adrian Cole287
|
|Kelly Graham (Soc. Cred.)162
||
|Raj Pannu
|}

Suburban Edmonton and Environs 

|-
|bgcolor=whitesmoke|Edmonton-Calder
|
|Brent Rathgeber3,680
|
|Brad Smith3,028
||
|David Eggen4,055
|
|Vicki Kramer526
|
| 
|
| 
||
|Brent Rathgeber
|-
|rowspan=2 bgcolor=whitesmoke|Edmonton Castle Downs

|
|Thomas Lukaszuk5,014
||
|Chris Kibermanis5,019
|
|Peter Cross1,317
|
|Colin Presizniuk583
|
| 
|
|Ross Korpi (Soc. Cred.)78
|rowspan=2 |
|rowspan=2|Thomas Lukaszuk
|-
||
|5,022
|
|5,019
|
|1,314
|
|586
|
|
|
|78
|-
|rowspan=3 bgcolor=whitesmoke|Edmonton Decore
|rowspan=3|
|rowspan=3|Walter Szwender3,033
|rowspan=3 |
|rowspan=3|Bill Bonko4,418
|rowspan=3|
|rowspan=3|Shirley Barg 1,524
|rowspan=3|
|rowspan=3|Gary Masyk830
|rowspan=3|
|rowspan=3| 
|rowspan=3|
|rowspan=3|Geoffrey Chevrier (Soc. Cred.)94
||
|Bill Bonner
|-
|colspan=2 align="center"|merged district
|-
||
|Gary Masyk
|-
|bgcolor=whitesmoke |Edmonton Ellerslie
|
|Gurnam Dodd3,245
||
|Bharat Agnihotri3,444
|
|Marilyn Assheton-Smith2,257
|
|Eleanor Maroes985
|
| 
|
|Amelia Maciejewski (Soc. Cred.)238
||
|vacant
|-
|bgcolor=whitesmoke |Edmonton-Manning
|
|Tony Vandermeer3,646
||
|Dan Backs3,873
|
|Laurie Lang2,371
|
|Mike Pietramala515
|
|Ross Adshead240
|
|Sean Tisdall (Soc. Cred.)130
||
|Tony Vandermeer
|-
|bgcolor=whitesmoke |Edmonton McClung
|
|Mark Norris5,331
||
|Mo Elsalhy5,864
|
|Lorne Dach1,362
|
|Reuben Bauer401
|
| 
|
|Patrick Conlin (Soc. Cred.)104
||
|Mark Norris
|-
|bgcolor=whitesmoke |Edmonton Meadowlark
|
|Bob Maskell4,243
||
|Maurice Tougas4,436
|
|Lance Burns1,303
|
|Aaron Campbell444
|
|Amanda Doyle245
|
|Peggy Morton (Ind.)77
||
|Bob Maskell
|-
|bgcolor=whitesmoke |Edmonton-Whitemud
||
|Dave Hancock7,493
|
|Donna L. Smith6,567
|
|Brian Fleck1,634
|
|Kathy Rayner469
|
| 
|
|John Andrews (Ind.)76
||
|David Hancock
|-
|bgcolor=whitesmoke |Sherwood Park
||
|Iris Evans7,276
|
|Louise Rogers5,587
|
|Tim Sloan994
|
|Cora LaBonte444
|
|Lynn Lau362
|
|Gordon Barrett (Soc. Cred.)474
||
|Iris Evans
|-
|bgcolor=whitesmoke |Spruce Grove-Sturgeon-St. Albert
||
|Doug Horner6,140
|
|Ray Boudreau5,559
|
|Dale Apostal1,020
|
|Tim Friesen740
|
| 
|
|Glen Blaylock (Soc. Cred.)170
||
|Doug Horner
|-
|bgcolor=whitesmoke |St. Albert
|
|Mary O'Neill6,064
||
|Jack Flaherty6,474
|
|Travis Thompson1,652
|
|Michaela Meldrum591
|
|Conrad Bitangcol407
|
| 
||
|Mary O'Neill
|-
|bgcolor=whitesmoke|Strathcona
||
|Rob Lougheed6,838
|
|Jon Friel4,115
|
|Tom Elchuk1,177
|
|Ryan Seto466
|
|
|
|Bruce Stubbs (Ab. Pty.)775Brian Rembowski (Soc. Cred.)327Roberta McDonald (Separation)297
|
|Recreated District
|}

Southern Alberta 

|-
|bgcolor=whitesmoke|Airdrie-Chestermere
||
|Carol Haley6,842
|
|John Burke1,633
|
|Grant Massie569
|
|Bradley Gaida758
|
|Angela Scully434
|
|Jeff Willerton (Alberta Pty.)1,036Bob Lefurgey (Separation)394 Jerry Gautreau (Soc. Cred.)178
||
|Carol Haley
|-
|bgcolor=whitesmoke|Cardston-Taber-Warner
|
|Broyce Jacobs3,753
|
|Paula Shimp783
|
|Luann Bannister185
||
|Paul Hinman3,884
|
|Lindsay Ferguson225
|
| 
||
|Broyce Jacobs
|-
|bgcolor=whitesmoke|Cypress-Medicine Hat
||
|Leonard Mitzel4,623
|
|Stuart Angle2,234
|
|Cliff Anten345
|
|Dan H. Pierson651
|
| 
|
|Eric Solberg (Soc. Cred.)561
||
|Lorne Taylor
|-
|bgcolor=whitesmoke|Highwood
||
|George Groeneveld6,782
|
|Lori Czerwinski1,843
|
|Catherine Whelan Costen432
|
|Brian Wickhorst733
|
|Sheelagh Matthews547
|
|Cory Morgan (Separation)299
||
|Don Tannas
|-
|bgcolor=whitesmoke|Lethbridge-East
|
|Rod Fong4,703
||
|Bridget Pastoor5,340
|
|Gaye Metz607
|
|Brian Stewart1,472
|
|Erin Matthews360
|
|Darren Popik (Soc. Cred.)251
||
|vacant
|-
|bgcolor=whitesmoke|Lethbridge-West
||
|Clint Dunford4,416
|
|Bal Boora3,675
|
|Mark Sandilands1,316
|
|Merle Terlesky949
|
|Andrea Sheridan368
|
|Scott Sawatsky (Soc. Cred.)357
||
|Clint Dunford
|-
|bgcolor=whitesmoke|Little Bow
||
|Barry McFarland4,894
|
|Arij Langstraat1,965
|
|Hugh Logie327
|
|Jay Phin859
|
| 
|
|Brian Cook (Soc. Cred.)556Grant Shaw (Separation)432
||
|Barry McFarland
|-
|bgcolor=whitesmoke|Livingstone-Macleod
||
|David Coutts5,095
|
|Craig Whitehead2,030
|
|Joyce Thomas626
|
|George Lyster1,493
|
|Chris Watts468
|
|Jim Walker (Separation)339
||
|David Coutts
|-
|bgcolor=whitesmoke|Medicine Hat
||
|Rob Renner5,392
|
|Karen Charlton3,482
|
|Diana Arnott560
|
|Scott Cowan1,073
|
| 
|
|Jonathan Lorentzen (Soc. Cred.)246
||
|Rob Renner
|-
|bgcolor=whitesmoke|Strathmore-Brooks
||
|Lyle Oberg6,051
|
|Carol Jacques1,055
|
|Don MacFarlane405
|
|Mark D. Ogden852
|
| 
|
|Jay Kolody (Separation)559Rudy Martens (Soc. Cred.)313
||
|Lyle Oberg
|}

Suburban Calgary 

|-
|bgcolor=whitesmoke|Calgary-Bow
||
|Alana DeLong6,097
|
|Kelly McDonnell3,509
|
|Jennifer Banks1,135
|
|James Istvanffy1,015
|
|Marie Picken713
|
| Margaret Askin (Independent)98Doug Picken (Soc. Cred.)97
||
|Alana DeLong
|-
|bgcolor=whitesmoke|Calgary-Cross
||
|Yvonne Fritz3,763
|
|Raleigh DeHaney1,452
|
|Jeanie Keebler391
|
|Gordon Huth648
|
|Ryan Richardson271
|
| 
||
|Yvonne Fritz
|-
|bgcolor=whitesmoke|Calgary-Foothills
||
|Len Webber5,820
|
|Stephen Jenuth3,559
|
|Malcolm Forster407
|
|Vincent S. Jansen-Van Doorn472
|
| 
|
| 
||
|Pat Nelson
|-
|bgcolor=whitesmoke|Calgary-Fort
||
|Wayne Cao4,136
|
|Gerry Hart1,784
|
|Elizabeth Thomas583
|
|Travis Chase589
|
|Tyler Charkie440
|
|Leo Ollenberger (Separation)212
||
|Wayne Cao
|-
|bgcolor=whitesmoke|Calgary-Hays
||
|Arthur Johnston5,529
|
|Sharon Howe1,952
|
|Rachel Weinfeld298
|
|Robert Wawrzynowski534
|
|Bernie Amell378
|
| 
|colspan=2|new district
|-
|bgcolor=whitesmoke|Calgary-Lougheed
||
|David Rodney6,334
|
|Allan Pollock2,971
|
|Matthew Koczkur365
|
|Tariq Khan445
|
|Ryan Boucher471
|
| 
||
|Marlene Graham
|-
|bgcolor=whitesmoke|Calgary-Mackay
||
|Gary Mar5,640
|
|Darryl Hawkins2,615
|
|Giorgio Cattabeni395
|
|Shawn Hubbard640
|
|David McTavish443
|
|Paul Martin (Independent)193
||
|Gary Mar
|-
|bgcolor=whitesmoke|Calgary-McCall
||
|Shiraz Shariff3,203
|
|Darshan Kang2,958
|
|Gurpreet (Preet) Sihota264
|
|Ina Givens573
|
|Sean Robert Brocklesby359
|
| 
||
|Shiraz Shariff
|-
|bgcolor=whitesmoke|Calgary-Montrose
||
|Hung Pham3,318
|
|Arthur Danielson1,651
|
|Jason Nishiyama434
|
|Cyril Collingwood674
|
|Kevin Colton355
|
| 
||
|Hung Pham
|-
|bgcolor=whitesmoke|Calgary-North West
||
|Greg Melchin7,768
|
|Judy Stewart4,488
|
|Bob Brunet518
|
|Jenell Friesen622
|
|Jeffrey Krekoski636
|
| 
||
|Greg Melchin
|-
|bgcolor=whitesmoke|Calgary-Shaw
||
|Cindy Ady6,732
|
|John Roggeveen2,373
|
|Jarrett Young300
|
|Barry Chase620
|
|Rick Papineau380
|
|Daniel Doherty (Separation)  171
||
|Cindy Ady
|-
|bgcolor=whitesmoke|Calgary-West
||
|Ron Liepert6,964
|
|Derek Smith4,286
|
|Chantelle Dubois434
|
|John Keyes988
|
|James Kohut732
|
| 
||
|Karen Kryczka
|}

Central Calgary 

|-
|bgcolor=whitesmoke|Calgary-Buffalo
||
|Harvey Cenaiko3,370
|
|Terry Taylor2,777
|
|Cliff Hesby455
|
|Nadine Hunka290
|
|Grant Neufeld656
|
|Elizabeth Kaur Fielding (Soc. Cred.)71Carl Schwartz (Alberta Pty.)58
||
|Harvey Cenaiko
|-
|bgcolor=whitesmoke|Calgary-Currie
|
|Jon Lord4,413
||
|Dave Taylor4,984
|
|Robert Scobel468
|
|Ken Mazeroll348
|
|Kim Warnke810
|
| 
||
|Jon Lord
|-
|bgcolor=whitesmoke|Calgary-East
||
|Moe Amery4,492
|
|Bill Harvey2,359
|
|Paul Vargis461
|
|Brad Berard605
|
|Rick Michalenko367
|
|Bonnie-Jean Collins (Communist)56
||
|Moe Amery
|-
|bgcolor=whitesmoke|Calgary-Egmont
||
|Denis Herard5,691
|
|Michael Queenan2,371
|
|Christopher Dovey599
|
|David Crutcher1,657
|
|George Read914
|
| 
||
|Denis Herard
|-
|bgcolor=whitesmoke|Calgary-Elbow
||
|Ralph Klein6,968
|
|Stephen Brown4,934
|
|Becky Kelley343
|
|Diana-Lynn Brooks485
|
|Allison Roth666
|
|Trevor Grover (Soc. Cred.)68Lloyd Blimke (Ind.)51
||
|Ralph Klein
|-
|bgcolor=whitesmoke|Calgary-Fish Creek
||
|Heather Forsyth6,829
|
|Tore Badenduck2,801
|
|Eric Leavitt794
|
|Mike Kuipers780
|
|Chris Sealy561
|
| 
||
|Heather Forsyth
|-
|bgcolor=whitesmoke|Calgary-Glenmore
||
|Ron Stevens6,257
|
|Avalon Roberts4,360
|
|Holly Heffernan550
|
|Ernest McCutcheon572
|
|Evan Sklarski531
|
|Larry R. Heather (Soc. Cred.)135
||
|Ron Stevens
|-
|bgcolor=whitesmoke|Calgary-Mountain View
|
|Mark Hlady4,058
||
|David Swann7,155
|
|John Donovan711
|
|Ryan Cassell589
|
|Mark MacGillivray912
|
| 
||
|Mark Hlady
|-
|bgcolor=whitesmoke|Calgary-North Hill
||
|Richard Magnus4,384
|
|Pat Murray3,223
|
|Aileen L. Machell630
|
|Brent Best627
|
|Susan Stratton1,264
|
| 
||
|Richard Magnus
|-
|bgcolor=whitesmoke|Calgary-Nose Hill
||
|Neil Brown4,369
|
|Len Borowski2,605
|
|Dirk Huysman552
|
|Bill McGregor1,073
|
|John Johnson584
|
|Raymond Hurst (Soc. Cred.)163
|colspan="2"|new district
|-
|bgcolor=whitesmoke|Calgary-Varsity
|
|Michael W. Smyth5,585
||
|Harry B. Chase6,303
|
|Mark Gabruch625
|
|Ron Beninger763
|
|Richard Larson753
|
|Len Skowronski (Soc. Cred.)118
||
|Murray Smith
|}

Electoral re-distribution 
Alberta's electoral laws fix the number of legislature seats at 83. As a result of the Alberta Electoral Boundary Re-distribution, 2004, Calgary gained two seats. Edmonton lost one seat, and one "special consideration" division was eliminated. Dunvegan-Central Peace is the sole remaining "special" division - due to its isolation, it is allowed to have a population below 75% of the provincial average. Lesser Slave Lake is now considered to be a standard rural division as its boundaries were re-drawn so that its population is slightly above 75% of the provincial average. One urbanized division outside Calgary and Edmonton was added, and two rural seats were eliminated.

Political parties 

For this election, there were 11 political parties registered with Elections Alberta.

Parties that elected MLAs in the previous election 
The parties are listed in descending order of number of MLAs elected in 2001.

Progressive Conservative Party 
Leader: Ralph Klein

In the 2001 election, the Progressive Conservatives recorded a result that was comparable to those achieved in their years of dominance under Peter Lougheed. The Tories received 627,252 out of 1,013,152 votes cast and won 74 seats, gaining 11 seats over and above their 1997 result at the expense of the Liberals. This result was achieved due to a resurgence of the party in Edmonton, where the Tories won a majority of seats for the first time since 1982. Premier Ralph Klein easily retained his Calgary-Elbow seat.

On April 8, 2002, Doug Griffiths retained the Tories' seat in Wainwright in the only by-election held since the 2001 election, albeit with a substantially reduced plurality. The Tories lost only one seat since the 2001 election, after Edmonton-Norwood MLA Gary Masyk crossed the floor to join the Alberta Alliance. As expected, the Tories nominated a full slate of candidates for the 2004 election.

External link

Liberal Party 
Leader: Kevin Taft

The 2001 election was generally regarded to be as a disaster for the Liberals. Although the Liberals retained Official Opposition status and received 276,854 votes, the party lost 11 seats to the Tories and won only seven seats, six of them in Edmonton. Leader Nancy Macbeth even lost her own seat in Edmonton-McClung - she resigned days after the election and was replaced by Ken Nicol, the Opposition's sole representative outside the capital.

Nicol eventually resigned as MLA for Lethbridge East and as Leader of the Opposition to run (unsuccessfully) for the Liberals in the federal election, as did Edmonton-Ellerslie MLA Debby Carlson. These seats remained vacant through dissolution. The Liberals were led in the 2004 election by Edmonton-Riverview MLA Kevin Taft, who was elected to the position in March 2004. The Liberals had 82 candidates in the 2004 election - they were absent from the ballot in Drumheller-Stettler after failing to file papers for their expected candidate, Don McMann before the deadline.

External link

New Democratic Party 
Leader: Brian Mason

In 2001, the New Democrats were unable to claim Official Opposition status from the floundering Liberals, but Leader Raj Pannu managed to hold the party's two existing seats—Pannu's own in Edmonton—Strathcona and Brian Mason's seat in Edmonton Highlands (later merged into Edmonton Highlands-Norwood). The "NDs", as they were then known, received 81,339 votes. Pannu resigned the leadership in July 2004, with Mason filling the role of interim leader before being elected to that position in September 2004. The party has also ceased abbreviating its name as "ND in favour of the more traditional "NDP" abbreviation. The NDP nominated a full slate of candidates for the 2004 election.

External link

Other registered parties 
The parties are listed in descending order of number of candidates nominated in 2004.

Alberta Alliance 
Leader: Randy Thorsteinson

The Alberta Alliance was registered in October 2002 and held its founding convention in February 2003. Its leader, Randy Thorsteinson had led Social Credit through a modest rebirth before quitting that party in April 1999. The party's sole MLA, Gary Masyk (Edmonton-Norwood) crossed the floor from the governing Progressive Conservatives on June 29, 2004. The Alliance nominated a full slate of candidates for the 2004 election, the only other party besides the Tories and the NDP to do so.

External link

Greens 
Leader: George Read

Also known as the "Green Party of Alberta", the Alberta Greens ran 10 candidates in the 2001 election, who combined for 2,850 votes. In the 2004 election, the Greens nominated 49 candidates - more than 4 times the highest number of candidates they had previously run in an election.

External link

Social Credit Party 
Leader: Lavern Ahlstrom

Prior to the 2001 election, the Social Credit Party was in turmoil following the departure of party leader Randy Thorsteinson. Under Lavern Ahlstrom, the party nominated 12 candidates in the 2001 election (down from 70 in 1997), and received 5,361 votes (down from 64,667). The party had 42 candidates for the 2004 election.

External link

Separation Party 
Interim Leader: Bruce Hutton

The Separation Party of Alberta was founded in June 2004 taking over the rights of the Alberta First Party. Bruce Hutton became interim leader. As a separatist party, it is the separatist successor to the Alberta Independence Party, which ran some independent candidates in the 2001 election, but never achieved official party status. The separatist cause was first taken up by the Western Canada Concept in the early 1980s when Gordon Kesler won a by-election. The Separation Party had 12 candidates in the 2004 election. See Alberta separatism.

External Link

Alberta Party 
Leader: Bruce Stubbs

The Alberta Party did not nominate any candidates in 2001, but nominated four candidates for the 2004 election.

External Link

Communist Party 
Leader: Naomi Rankin

The Communist Party nominated two candidates in the 2001 election, who combined for 117 votes. They ran two candidates in the 2004 election.

The Equity Party 
Leader: Emil van der Poorten

The Equity Party ran no candidates in this election, The party was de-registered after the Alberta government amended the Elections Act to force a party to run at least one candidate, the party failed to field a candidate and was de-registered.

Reform Party 
Leader: David Salmon

The Alberta Party, Equity Party and the Reform Party did not run any candidates in the 2001 election. The Equity Party and Reform Party were also absent from the ballot in 2004. The party was de-registered after the Alberta government amended the Elections Act to force a party to run at least one candidate, the party failed to field a candidate and was de-registered.

De-registered parties 
The Natural Law Party of Alberta was de-registered by Elections Alberta in 2001, after they stopped filing financial statements. In 2001 The Natural Law Party did not nominate any candidates.

Independent candidates 
29 independent candidates ran in the 2001 election. These candidates won a total of 10,528 votes. 10 independents ran in 2004.

Standings in the 25th Legislature

Standings after the 25th general election

Standings at dissolution

Timeline 
March 27, 2004 - Kevin Taft becomes leader of the Alberta Liberals.

June 29, 2004 - Gary Masyk crosses the floor from the Progressive Conservatives to the Alberta Alliance.

July 13, 2004 - Raj Pannu resigns as leader of the Alberta New Democrats. Brian Mason is appointed interim leader.

September 9, 2004 - Alberta Alliance kicked off five-city "I Blame Ralph" tour in Edmonton.  Ralph Klein announces Senate Election

September 18, 2004 - Brian Mason formally becomes leader of the Alberta New Democrats.

October 25, 2004 - At the request of Premier Ralph Klein, Lieutenant-Governor Lois Hole dissolves the legislature and sets the election day for November 22.

October 28, 2004 - Premier Klein is harshly criticized by opposition parties and activist groups after he claims that protestors on Alberta's Assured Income for the Severely Handicapped (AISH) who had heckled him did not look severely disabled.

October 31, 2004 - Premier Klein's mother, Florence Gray dies at the age of 80 following a year-long illness. All major parties announce they will suspend their provincial campaigns while the premier mourns.

November 4, 2004 - Global Television Network re-iterates that they will not invite Alberta Alliance leader Randy Thorsteinson to their leaders debate, because his party did not elect any members in the previous election and their sole MLA crossed the floor. The decision sparks anger amongst Alliance members and even disappoints the other three leaders.

November 8, 2004 - Close of nomination's and the Global television leaders debate involving Klein, Taft and Mason.

November 13, 2004 - NDP leader Mason releases a brochure entitled Health Care for Dummies in an effort to mock the premier's reluctance to discuss health care in detail during the campaign.

November 18, 2004 - Advance polling stations open.

November 19, 2004, - Advance polling stations open, and Students across the province vote in Alberta Student Vote, 2004.

November 20, 2004 - Advance polling stations open.

November 22, 2004 - Voting day for the 26th Alberta general election.
 8:00 p.m. local time: Polls close (03:00, November 23 UTC)
 8:36 p.m.: CBC projects a PC majority (03:36, November 23 UTC)

December 9, 2004 - The Court of Queen's Bench rules that Chris Kibermanis (Lib.) won the election in Edmonton Castle Downs by three votes, upholding the result of the initial, election-night result. The PC candidate, Thomas Lukaszuk, appealed to the Court of Appeal of Alberta.

January 24, 2005 - The Alberta Court of Appeal rules that Lukaszuk won the election in Edmonton Castle Downs by three votes, overturning the result of the first vote-count, which had given the seat to Kibermanis of the Liberals. Kibermanis accepted defeat and did not appeal to the Supreme Court of Canada.

Poll numbers 
Ipsos-Reid, 2004-10-29: PC 50%, Lib 26%, NDP 10%, AAP 9%, Green 4%
COMPAS Inc. / Calgary Herald, 2004-11-03, 2004-11-04: PC 61%, Lib 19%, NDP 16%, Green 3%, Separation 1%, Other 1%. The pollsters only prompted for the three "major" parties yet Green and Separation showed up over 1% in the results while the Alliance, which is contesting every riding and holds a seat in the legislature, did not. 
Cameron Strategy Inc. / Global News / Calgary Herald, 2004-11-08-11-16: PC 47%, Lib 21%, NDP 11%, AAP 9%, Green 5%
Ipsos-Reid, 2004-11-12 to 2004-11-17: PC 44%, Lib 29%, NDP 12%, AAP 9%, Green 4% (800 adults, MoE 3.5%)

Works cited

References

Bibliography

Further reading

External links 
Elections Alberta
Alberta Legislative Assembly
Final Report of the Alberta Electoral Boundaries Commission
Riding maps (2003 representation)
Official Results of the 2004 Election

Media coverage 
CBC Coverage: Alberta Votes 2004

Alberta general
2004
2004 in Alberta
November 2004 events in Canada